A coffee filter is a filter used for brewing coffee. Filters made of  paper (disposable), cloth (reusable), or plastic, metal or porcelain (permanent) are used. The filter allows the liquid coffee to flow through, but traps the coffee grounds.

Paper filters remove oily components called diterpenes; these organic compounds, present in unfiltered coffee, have anti-inflammatory properties. Metal, nylon or porcelain mesh filters do not remove these components.

History 
On 8 July 1908, the first paper coffee filter was invented by German entrepreneur Melitta Bentz. She wanted to remove the bitter taste caused by overbrewing. She patented her invention and formed a company, Melitta, to sell the coffee filters, hiring her husband and two sons to assist her as the first employees.

The Flemish coffee company Rombouts was founded in Antwerp in 1896. In 1958, the company launched its first one cup coffee filter for the Brussels World Exhibition, allowing a cup of coffee to be made using the perfect amount of roasted and ground coffee. In 1964, the company began marketing the concept and enjoyed much success in the horeca and retail sectors. In 1966, Rombouts was appointed a "Certified Royal Warrant Holder of Belgium".

Paper filter 

Coffee filters of paper are made from about 100 g/m2 filter paper. The raw materials (pulp) for the filter paper are coarse long fiber, often from fast-growing trees. Both bleached and unbleached filters are made.

Typically coffee filters are made up of filaments approximately 20 micrometres wide, which allow particles through that are less than approximately 10 to 15 micrometres.

For a filter to be compatible with a filter holder or coffee maker, the filter needs to be a specific shape and size.

Melitta originally introduced a system consisting of cone filter bag sizes "100" (for 1–2 cups à ⅙–⅛ litre), "101" (for 2–3 or 2–4 cups), "102" (for 3–6, 4–6 or 4–8 cups), "103" (for 6–15, 8–15 cups or 10–15), "104" (for 15–25 or 15–30 cups), "105" (for 25–50 or 30–60 cups), "106" (for 50–80 cups), "112" (with pot mount) and "123" (for 6–10 cups). A disadvantage of this system was that one had to pour water continuously or several times while the proper amount of necessary water could only be guessed.

Therefore, in 1965 Melitta developed a new cone filter system with corresponding "1×" nomenclature: In this system the filters are sized big enough so that the whole amount of water (except for the water needed for blooming) can be poured in one go. Consequently, the filter sizes "1×2", "1×4", "1×6" and "1×10" result in 2, 4, 6, and 10 cups of coffee when filling the filter once.

Both systems are still in use today in principle, but the sizes "103", "104", "105", "106", "112", "123" and "1x10" are no longer manufactured.

Common in the US are cone-shaped filters "#0" (similar to "100"), "#1" (similar to "101"), "#2" (similar to "102"), "#4" (similar to "1×4"), and "#6" (similar to "1×6"), with "#2", "#4" and "#6" being particularly popular, as well as basket-shaped filters in an 8–12 cup home size and larger restaurant sizes.

In addition, the Melitta filter size system included sizes for other types like tea filters "401" (1–6 cups, compatible with "101") and "402" (for 3–9 cups), the miniature filter "801" (for 1–2 small cups for children), pyramid filters "202s", "203", "206(G)", "220(G)", "240(G)" and "270(G)", round filters "1", "1a", "2" and "2b", circle filters (for percolators) "164mm", "190mm", "203mm", "235mm", "240mm", "244mm", "256mm", "260mm", "290mm", "330mm", "400mm" and "440mm", basket filters "(A)250/90" and "(A)250/110", roll filters "2004" as well as wrap filters. While some of them are still available today, most of them have fallen out of use for long.

Brigitta once marketted a cone filter size "502".

Hario has paper filter bag sizes "01", "02" and "03" for their V60 filter holders.

Other important coffee filter paper parameters are strength, compatibility, efficiency and capacity.

If a coffee filter is not strong enough, it will tear or rupture, allowing coffee grains through to the coffee pot. Compatibility describes a filter medium's resistance to degradation by heat and chemical attack; a filter that is not compatible with the liquid passing through it is likely to break down, losing strength (structural failure). Efficiency is the retention of particles in a target (size) category. The efficiency is dictated by the particles or substances to be removed. A large-mesh filter may be efficient at retaining large particles but inefficient at retaining small particles. Capacity is the ability to "hold" previously removed particles while allowing further flow. A very efficient filter may show poor capacity, causing increased resistance to flow or other problems as it plugging up prematurely and increasing resistance or flow problems. A balance between particle capture and flow requirements must be met while ensuring integrity.

Other types 
Permanent metal filters are also used to prepare filtered coffee, including Vietnamese iced coffee and Indian filter coffee. The "French press" (also referred to as cafetière) uses a metal filter. Other types of permanent filters are made of plastic or porcelain.

Cloth, reusable, has been used to filter coffee for a very long time. Like paper, it strains out the coffee grounds, but the typical cloth filter allows more of the oil to come through than typical paper filters.

See also 

 Drip brew
 Coffee pod (coffee bag)
 Single-serve coffee container
 Ground coffee filter ring
 Tea bag or tea ball

References 

Water filters
Food preparation utensils
German inventions
Coffee preparation
Products introduced in 1908
1908 in Germany